Canal 4 (Nueva Imagen, S.A.) is a state-run nationwide terrestrial television channel in Nicaragua owned by Informativos de Televisión y Radio S.A. (Intrasa), a company owned by two sons of Nicaraguan President Daniel Ortega, Carlos Enrique "Tino" Ortega and his brother Daniel Edmundo. Until 2007, Remigio Ángel González of Albavisión owned 94% of the channel's assets, after that, the Ortega-Murillo family regained control.

History
Before the formation of the Sandinist government, the frequency was first used by Telecadena Nicaraguense, assigned to Oleoductos de Nicaragua S.A., from Anastasio Somoza Debayle, and granted to journalist Luis Felipe Hidalgo. The station signed on on August 12, 1970, but shut down in 1972 for two factors: the lack of a wide television market to cover all of the existing channels, and the high cost of television production.

Following the defeat of the Sandinist regime, in the early 1990s, Remigio Ángel González helped the FSLN in the creation of Canal 4, initially led by Dionisio Marenco. Marenco recalls travelling to Miami, where González had an office, and González supported the creation of the channel from scratch, in a very hostile environment, providing mainly with equipment.

The channel experienced a crisis in the 1990s. This was seen as an opportunity for Ángel Gonzáles to set up Nueva Imagen, kicking off a productive relation with Canal 10.

A new policy affected the channel in 1998. Many Nicaraguan productions (Generación 2000, Tú Música, Tita; Ternura, Puerta Diez) were cancelled as part of a new policy to clean local productions from the channel, the only ones that survived were the newscast (Multinoticias) and La cámara matizona, due to a transfer of ownership.

Under the commercial control of RATENSA, the channel was also subject to some technological advancements that its then-sister channel Canal 10 was subjected to, including a 24/7 cable feed on ESTESA and wider carriage on cable operators in areas with weak terrestrial reception.

Over time, the RATENSA administration caused a debt for the channel, as the Sandinists were unable to pay the programs they bought from González. When Daniel Ortega became president of Nicaragua again in January 2007, he recovered Canal 4's assets, but González later was benefitted from other frequencies (11 and later 9)

References

External links
 Canal 4

Television stations in Nicaragua
Television channels and stations established in 1992
Spanish-language television stations